Winfield is a station on Metra's Union Pacific West Line, located in Winfield, Illinois, at the corner of Jewell Road and Winfield Road. Unless otherwise announced, inbound trains use the north platform and outbound trains use the south platform.

As of December 5, 2022, Winfield is served by all 49 trains (25 inbound, 24 outbound) on weekdays, by all 10 trains in each direction on Saturdays, and by all nine trains in each direction on Sundays and holidays.

Winfield station is located at ground level and consists of two side platforms. Three tracks run between the platforms, though one does not access the station. There is an unstaffed station house next to the north track, which is open 24 hours. No bus connections are available at Winfield.

Surrounding area
The station is within walking distance of Central DuPage Hospital.

References

External links 

Station from Winfield Road from Google Maps Street View

Metra stations in Illinois
Former Chicago and North Western Railway stations
Winfield, Illinois
Railway stations in DuPage County, Illinois
Railway stations in the United States opened in 1980
Union Pacific West Line